Esther Haywood (born January 15, 1940) is an American politician who served in the Missouri House of Representatives from the 71st district from 2001 to 2009.

References

1940 births
Living people
Democratic Party members of the Missouri House of Representatives
Women state legislators in Missouri